USS Denebola is a name used more than once by the U.S. Navy:

 , was built in 1919 as Edgewood by Skinner and Eddy, Seattle, Washington and commissioned 28 November 1921. She served in World War II and was decommissioned there 10 April 1946.
 , was launched 10 June 1944 as Hibbing Victory by Oregon Shipbuilding Co., Portland, Oregon and commissioned in the Navy on 20 January 1954.
 

United States Navy ship names